Thule is the most northerly location mentioned in ancient Greek and Roman literature and cartography. Modern interpretations have included Orkney, Shetland, northern Scotland, the island of Saaremaa (Ösel) in Estonia, and the Norwegian island of Smøla.

In classical and medieval literature, ultima Thule (Latin "farthest Thule") acquired a metaphorical meaning of any distant place located beyond the "borders of the known world".

By the Late Middle Ages and early modern period, the Greco-Roman Thule was often identified with the real Iceland or Greenland. Sometimes Ultima Thule was a Latin name for Greenland, when Thule was used for Iceland. By the late 19th century, however, Thule was frequently identified with Norway.

In 1910, the explorer Knud Rasmussen established a missionary and trading post in north-western Greenland, which he named "Thule" (later Qaanaaq).

Thule has given its name to the northernmost United States Space Force base, Thule Air Base in northwest Greenland.

Classical antiquity and the Middle Ages
The Greek explorer Pytheas of the Greek city of Massalia (now Marseille, France) is the first to have written of Thule, after his travels between 330 and 320 BC. Pytheas mentioned going to Thule in his now lost work, On The Ocean Τὰ περὶ τοῦ Ὠκεανοῦ (ta peri tou Okeanou). L. Sprague de Camp wrote that "the city of Massalia... sent Pytheas to scout northern Europe to see where their trade-goods were coming from." Descriptions of some of his discoveries have survived in the works of later, often skeptical, authors. Polybius in his Histories (c. 140 BC), Book XXXIV, cites Pytheas as one "who has led many people into error by saying that he traversed the whole of Britain on foot, giving the island a circumference of forty thousand stadia, and telling us also about Thule, those regions in which there was no longer any proper land nor sea nor air, but a sort of mixture of all three of the consistency of a jellyfish in which one can neither walk nor sail, holding everything together, so to speak."

The first century BC Greek astronomer Geminus of Rhodes claimed that the name Thule went back to an archaic word for the polar night phenomenon – "the place where the sun goes to rest". Dionysius Periegetes in his De situ habitabilis orbis also touched upon this subject, as did Martianus Capella. Avienius in his Ora Maritima added that during the summer on Thule night lasted only two hours, a clear reference to the midnight sun.

Strabo, in his Geographica (c. AD 30), mentions Thule in describing Eratosthenes' calculation of "the breadth of the inhabited world" and notes that Pytheas says it "is a six days' sail north of Britain, and is near the frozen sea". But he then doubts this claim, writing that Pytheas has "been found, upon scrutiny, to be an arch falsifier, but the men who have seen Britain and Ireland do not mention Thule, though they speak of other islands, small ones, about Britain". Strabo adds the following in Book 5: "Now Pytheas of Massilia tells us that Thule, the most northerly of the Britannic Islands, is farthest north, and that there the circle of the summer tropic is the same as the Arctic Circle. But from the other writers I learn nothing on the subject – neither that there exists a certain island by the name of Thule, nor whether the northern regions are inhabitable up to the point where the summer tropic becomes the Arctic Circle." Strabo ultimately concludes, "Concerning Thule, our historical information is still more uncertain, on account of its outside position; for Thule, of all the countries that are named, is set farthest north." The inhabitants or people of Thule are described in most detail by Strabo (citing Pytheas): "the people (of Thule) live on millet and other herbs, and on fruits and roots; and where there are grain and honey, the people get their beverage, also, from them. As for the grain, he says, since they have no pure sunshine, they pound it out in large storehouses, after first gathering in the ears thither; for the threshing floors become useless because of this lack of sunshine and because of the rains".

The mid-first century Roman geographer Pomponius Mela placed Thule north of Scythia.

In AD 77, Pliny the Elder published his Natural History in which he also cites Pytheas' claim (in Book II, Chapter 75) that Thule is a six-day sail north of Britain. Then, when discussing the islands around Britain, he writes: "The farthest of all, which are known and spoke of, is Thule; in which there be no nights at all, as we have declared, about mid-summer, namely when the Sun passes through the sign Cancer; and contrariwise no days in mid-winter: and each of these times they suppose, do last six months, all day, or all night." Finally, in refining the island's location, he places it along the most northerly parallel of those he describes: "Last of all is the Scythian parallel, from the Rhiphean hills into Thule: wherein (as we said) it is day and night continually by turns (for six months)."

The Roman historian Tacitus, in his book chronicling the life of his father-in-law, Agricola, describes how the Romans knew that Britain (in which Agricola was Roman commander) was an island rather than a continent, by circumnavigating it. Tacitus writes of a Roman ship visiting Orkney and claims the ship's crew even sighted Thule. However their orders were not to explore there, as winter was at hand. Some scholars believe that Tacitus was referring to Shetland.

The third-century Latin grammarian Gaius Julius Solinus wrote in his Polyhistor that "Thyle, which was distant from Orkney by a voyage of five days and nights, was fruitful and abundant in the lasting yield of its crops". The 4th century Virgilian commentator Servius also believed that Thule sat close to Orkney: "Thule; an island in the Ocean between the northern and western zone, beyond Britain, near Orkney and Ireland; in this Thule, when the sun is in Cancer, it is said that there are perpetual days without nights..."

Other late classical writers such as Orosius (384–420) describe Thule as being north and west of both Ireland and Britain, strongly suggesting that it was Iceland.

Solinus (d. AD 400) in his Polyhistor, repeated these descriptions, noting that the people of Thule had a fertile land where they grew a good production of crop and fruits.

In the writings of the historian Procopius, from the first half of the sixth century, Thule is a large island in the north inhabited by 25 tribes. It is believed that Procopius is really talking about a part of Scandinavia, since several tribes are easily identified, including the Geats (Gautoi) in present-day Sweden and the Sami people (Scrithiphini). He also writes that when the Herules returned, they passed the Warini and the Danes and then crossed the sea to Thule, where they settled beside the Geats.

The Irish monk Dicuil in his "Liber De Mensura Orbis Terrae" (written circa 825) after quoting various classical sources describing Thule, says "It is now thirty years since clerics, who had lived on the island from the first of February to the first of August, told me that not only at the summer solstice, but in the days round about it, the sun setting in the evening hides itself as though behind a small hill in such a way that there was no darkness in that very small space of time, and a man could do whatever he wished as though the sun were there, even remove lice from his shirt, and if they had been on a mountain-top perhaps the sun would never have been hidden from them. In the middle of that moment of time it is midnight at the equator, and thus, on the contrary, I think that at the winter solstice and for a few days about it dawn appears only for the smallest space at Thule, when it is noon at the equator. Therefore those authors are wrong and give wrong information, who have written that the sea will be solid about Thule, and that day without night continues right through from the vernal to the autumnal equinox, and that vice versa night continues uninterrupted from the autumnal to the vernal equinox, since these men voyaged at the natural time of great cold, and entered the island and remaining on it had day and night alternately except for the period of the solstice. But one day's sail north of that they did find the sea frozen over. There are many other islands in the ocean to the north of Britain which can be reached from the northern islands of Britain in a direct voyage of two days and nights with sails filled with a continuously favourable wind. A devout priest told me that in two summer days and the intervening night he sailed in a two-benched boat and entered one of them. There is another set of small islands, nearly all separated by narrow stretches of water; in these for nearly a hundred years hermits sailing from our country, Ireland, have lived. But just as they were always deserted from the beginning of the world, so now because of the Northman pirates they are emptied of anchorites, and filled with countless sheep and very many diverse kinds of sea-birds. I have never found these islands mentioned in the authorities".

Modern research 
The British surveyor Charles Vallancey (1731–1812) was one of many antiquarians to argue that Ireland was Thule, as he does in his book An essay on the antiquity of the Irish language.

Another hypothesis, first proposed by Lennart Meri in 1976, holds that the island of Saaremaa (which is often known by the exonym Osel) in Estonia, could be Thule. That is, there is a phonological similarity between Thule and the root tule- "of fire" in Estonian (and other Finnic languages). A crater lake named Kaali on the island appears to have been formed by a meteor strike in prehistory. This meteor strike is often linked to Estonian folklore which has it that Saaremaa was a place where the sun at one point "went to rest".

In 2010, scientists from the Institute of Geodesy and Geoinformation Science at the Technical University of Berlin claimed to have identified persistent errors in calculation that had occurred in attempts by modern geographers to superimpose geographic coordinate systems upon Ptolemaic maps. After correcting for these errors, the scientists claimed, Ptolemy's Thule could be mapped to the Norwegian island of Smøla.

Modern geography and science
In 1775, during his second voyage, Captain Cook named an island in the high southern latitudes of the South Atlantic Ocean, Southern Thule. The name is now used for a group of three southernmost islands in the South Sandwich Islands, one of which is called Thule Island. The island group became a British overseas territory of the United Kingdom, albeit also claimed by Argentina (in Spanish Islas Tule del Sur).

In 1910, the explorer Knud Rasmussen established a missionary and trading post, which he named Thule (Inuit: Avanaa) on Greenland. The Thule people, the predecessor of modern Inuit Greenlanders, were named after the Thule region. In 1953, Avanaa became Thule Air Base, operated by United States Air Force. The population was forced to resettle to New Thule (Qaanaaq),  to the north ( only 840 NM from the North Pole).
 
The Scottish Gaelic for Iceland is Innis Tile, which literally means the "Isle of Thule".

Thule lends its name to the 69th element in the periodic table, thulium.

Ultima Thule is the name of a location in the Mammoth Cave system in Kentucky, United States. It was formerly the terminus of the known-explorable southeastern (upstream) end of the passage called "Main Cave", before discoveries made in 1908 by Ed Bishop and Max Kaemper showed an area accessible beyond it, now the location of the Violet City Entrance. The Violet City Lantern tour offered at the cave passes through Ultima Thule near the conclusion of the route.

The Southern Thule islands were occupied by Argentina in 1976. The occupation was not militarily contested by the British until the 1982 Falklands War, during which time British sovereignty was restored by a contingent of Royal Marines. Currently the three islands are uninhabited.

In March 2018, following a naming competition, the Kuiper belt object 486958 Arrokoth, a fly-by target of the NASA probe New Horizons, was nicknamed "Ultima Thule". The fly-by took place on 1 January 2019, and was the most distant encounter between a spacecraft and a planetary body. An official name for the body has since been assigned by the International Astronomical Union.

Literary references

Classical literature
In the metaphorical sense of a far-off land or an unattainable goal, Virgil coined the term Ultima Thule (Georgics, 1. 30) meaning "farthermost Thule".

Seneca the Younger writes of a day when new lands will be discovered past Thule. This was later quoted widely in the context of Christopher Columbus' voyages.

The Roman poet Silius Italicus (AD 25 – 101) wrote that the people of Thule were painted blue: "the blue-painted native of Thule, when he fights, drives around the close-packed ranks in his scythe-bearing chariot", implying a link to the Picts (whose exonym is derived from the Latin pictus "painted"). Martial (AD 40 – 104) talks about "blue" and "painted Britons", just like Julius Caesar. Claudian (AD 370 – 404) also believed that the inhabitants of Thule were Picts.

A work of prose fiction in Greek by Antonius Diogenes entitled The Wonders Beyond Thule appeared c. AD 150 or earlier. (Gerald N. Sandy, in the introduction to his translation of Photius' ninth century summary of the work,
notes that this Thule most closely matches Iceland.)

Cleomedes referenced Pytheas' journey to Thule, but added no new information.

Early in the fifth century AD Claudian, in his poem, On the Fourth Consulship of the Emperor Honorius, Book VIII, rhapsodizes on the conquests of the emperor Theodosius I, declaring that the Orcades "ran red with Saxon slaughter; Thule was warm with the blood of Picts; ice-bound Hibernia [Ireland] wept for the heaps of slain Scots". This implies that Thule was Scotland. But in Against Rufinias, the Second Poem, Claudian writes of "Thule lying icebound beneath the pole-star". Jordanes in his Getica also wrote that Thule sat under the pole-star.

The "known world' of the Europeans came to be viewed as bounded in the east by India and in the west by Thule, as expressed in the Consolation of Philosophy (III, 203 = metrus V, v. 7) by Boethius. "For though the earth, as far as India's shore, tremble before the laws you give, though Thule bow to your service on earth's farthest bounds, yet if thou canst not drive away black cares, if thou canst not put to flight complaints, then is no true power thine."

Medieval and early modern works
In the early seventh century, Isidore of Seville wrote in his Etymologies that:Ultima Thule (Thyle ultima) is an island of the Ocean in the northwestern region, beyond Britannia, taking its name from the sun, because there the sun makes its summer solstice, and there is no daylight beyond (ultra) this. Hence its sea is sluggish and frozen.Isidore distinguished this from the islands of Britannia, Thanet (Tanatos), the Orkney (Orcades), and Ireland (Scotia or Hibernia). Isidore was to have a large influence upon Bede, who was later to mention Thule.

By the late Middle Ages, scholars were linking Iceland and/or Greenland to the name Thule and/or places reported by the Irish mariner Saint Brendan (in the 6th century) and other distant or mythical locations, such as Hy Brasil and Cockaigne. These scholars included works by Dicuil (see above), the Anglo-Saxon monk the Venerable Bede in De ratione temporum, the Landnámabók, by the anonymous Historia Norwegie, and by the German cleric Adam of Bremen in his Deeds of Bishops of the Hamburg Church, where they cite both ancient writers' use of Thule as well as new knowledge since the end of antiquity. All these authors also understood that other islands were situated to the north of Britain.

Eustathius of Thessalonica, in his twelfth-century commentary on the Iliad, wrote that the inhabitants of Thule were at war with a tribe whose members dwarf-like, only 20 fingers in height. The American classical scholar Charles Anthon believed this legend may have been rooted in history (although exaggerated), if the dwarf or pygmy tribe were interpreted as being a smaller aboriginal tribe of Britain the people on Thule had encountered.

Petrarch, in the fourteenth century, wrote in his Epistolae familiares ("Familiar Letters") that Thule lay in the unknown regions of the far north-west.

A madrigal by Thomas Weelkes, entitled Thule (1600), describes it with reference to the Icelandic volcano Hekla: 

The English poet Ambrose Philips began, but did not complete, a poem concerning The Fable of Thule which he published in 1748.

Thule is referred to in Goethe's poem "Der König in Thule" (1774). The King and Kingdom of Thule referenced in the poem have no historical basis, nor did Goethe claim such. Goethe's poem was 
famously set to music by Franz Schubert (D 367, 1816), Franz Liszt (S.531) and Robert Schumann (Op.67, No.1), and in the collection Ultima Thule (1880) by Henry Wadsworth Longfellow.

Modern literature

Edgar Allan Poe's poem "Dream-Land" (1844) begins with the following stanza: 

John Henry Wilbrandt Stuckenberg wrote on the subject in 1885: 

Kelly Miller, addressing the Hampton Alumni Association in 1899, explained that

"Civilization may be defined as the sum total of those influences and agencies that make for knowledge and virtue. This is the goal, the ultima Thule, of all human strivings. The essential factors of civilization are knowledge, industry, culture, and virture."

Ultima Thule is the title of the 1929 novel by Henry Handel Richardson, set in colonial Australia.

Hal Foster's protagonist Prince Valiant gets his title from being the son of Aguar, exiled king of Thule who has taken refuge in the Fens during the days of King Arthur. Foster places this kingdom of Thule on the Norwegian mainland, near Trondheim.

"Ultima Thule" is a short story written by author Vladimir Nabokov and published in New Yorker magazine on April 7, 1973.

Jorge Luis Borges uses the classic Latin phrase "ultima Thule" in his poem A Reader. He uses the phrase to connect the study of Latin in his younger years to his more recent efforts to read the Icelandic poet Snorri Sturluson.

Bernard Cornwell references Thule in his novel The Lords of the North, the third book in the series The Last Kingdom. The character Uhtred of Bebbanburg calls it, "that strange land of ice and flame".

Thule is mentioned in Asterix and the Chieftain's Daughter.

Cassandra Clare's The Shadowhunter Chronicles, features an alternate dimension called Thule.

In Nazi ideology
In early 20th century Germany, some well-known occultists believed in a historical Thule, or Hyperborea, as the ancient origin of the "Aryan race" (a term which they believed had been used by the hypothetical Proto-Indo-European people). The Thule Society, which had close links to the Deutsche Arbeiter Partei (DAP, later known as the Nationalsozialistische Deutsche Arbeiterpartei, NSDAP) was, according to its own account, founded on August18, 1918. In his biography of Lanz von Liebenfels (1874–1954), Der Mann, der Hitler die Ideen gab (published in Munich, 1985; translated as The Man who Gave Hitler the Ideas), the Viennese psychologist and author Wilfried Daim wrote that the Thule Gesellschaft name originated from mythical Thule. In his history of the SA (Mit ruhig festem Schritt, 1998 – With Firm and Steady Step), Wilfred von Oven, Joseph Goebbels' press adjutant from 1943 to 1945, confirmed that Pytheas' Thule was the historical Thule for the Thule Gesellschaft.

Much of this interest in Thule was initially due to rumours surrounding the Oera Linda Book, claimed to have been found by Cornelis over de Linden in the 19th century. The Oera Linda Book was partially translated into German in 1933 by Herman Wirth and was favoured by Heinrich Himmler. The book has since been discredited. Professor of Frisian Language and Literature Goffe Jensma wrote that the three authors of the translation intended it "to be a temporary hoax to fool some nationalist Frisians and orthodox Christians and as an experiential exemplary exercise in reading the Holy Bible in a non-fundamentalist, symbolical way".

See also

 Mythical place
 Phantom island

References

Bibliography
  Downloadable Google Books.
 
 
 Joanna Kavenna, The Ice Museum: In Search of the Lost Land of Thule, London, Penguin, 2006.

External links
Site with detailed notes on the classical and Renaissance sources for Thule

Geography of Europe
Geography of Greenland
Mythological islands
Phantom islands of the Atlantic
Occultism in Nazism
Locations in Greek mythology
Ancient Greek geography